The Cinequest Film & Creativity Festival is an annual independent film festival held each March in San Jose, California and Redwood City, California. The international festival combines the cinematic arts with Silicon Valley’s innovation. It is produced by Cinequest, a not-for-profit 501(c)(3) organization that is also responsible for Picture The Possibilities and the distribution label Cinequest Mavericks Studio LLC. Cinequest awards the annual Maverick Spirit Awards. In addition to over 130 world or U.S. premieres from over 30 countries, the festival hosts writer's events including screenwriting competitions, a shorts program,  technology and artistic forums and workshops, student programs, and a silent film accompanied on the theatre organ. Founded in 1990 as the Cinequest Film Festival, the festival was rebranded in 2017 as the Cinequest Film & VR Festival and expanded beyond downtown San Jose to Redwood City. It took its present name in 2019.

History
Filmmakers Halfdan Hussey and Kathleen Powell founded Cinequest in 1990. That year the festival showed 60 films in a single theater, the Camera 3 Cinemas in San Jose; 3,000 people attended. By 2013 there were 100,000 attendees. In 2014 the festival showed 84 world premieres, by film makers in 43 countries, including one filmed using an iPhone.

The festival expanded to ten days in 2000, Cinequest Online was launched in 2004 and Cinequest Mavericks Studio in 2010. and in 2017 changed its name to the Cinequest Film & VR Festival, to reflect the major role of Silicon Valley in developing virtual reality. In 2019, the festival was rebranded as Cinequest Film & Creativity Festival and occurred March 5 – 17, 2019. That year it held events at the California Theatre, Hammer Theatre Center, Camera 3 Cinemas, Redwood City Century Downtown 20, and Fairmont Hotel.

In 2019, the festival was again renamed to the Cinequest Film & Creativity Festival in recognition of the many creative experiences presented each year including film, virtual and augmented realities, comedy, television, fashion, art and design, dance, and more. The 30th-anniversary 2020 festival, scheduled for March 3 – 15, 2020 in San Jose and Redwood City, has Elation as its theme; the second week was postponed to August because of the COVID-19 outbreak.

Cinequest Film Festival has gained a reputation as a discovery event: Chris Gore's Ultimate Film Festival Survival Guide recommends it as showing "the future of film". USA Today readers voted Cinequest as the best Film Festival.

Awards
Cinequest offers several awards during the festival season. The Maverick Spirit Awards, the Maverick Innovator Awards, and the Media Legacy Awards highlight notable individuals in film and technology. The Maverick Individual awards are given to films at the conclusion of the festival via jury and audience voting.

Maverick Spirit Awards
The Maverick Spirit Award is given to influential individuals who embody the independent and innovative mindset. It is the most prestigious award given at the Cinequest Film Festival. Over the past 27 years, Cinequest has honored the following artists:

Maverick Innovator Awards
The Media Innovator Award honors technologists whose thoughts, methods and innovations have significantly advanced their industries, their careers, and the world. Cinequest has honored the following people:

Media Legacy Awards
The Media Legacy Award, inaugurated in 2014, honors film journalists, "the champions who provide audiences and, thus, life blood for artists and films". Cinequest has honored the following people:

Film Awards
Several awards are given on the closing night of the festival to individual films selected either by a panel of judges or by audience surveys and votes. The most noteworthy awards are:
Top Film - Awarded to the best film in any category
Best Documentary Feature
Best First Feature - Awarded for a director's first feature-length film
Best Short Narrative Film
Audience Favorite Narrative - Awarded to the most popular narrative film based on audience surveys and screening attendance
Audience Favorite Documentary - Awarded to the most popular documentary film based om audience surveys and screening attendance

Listed below are all of Cinequest's awards:

Maverick Film Competition
Maverick Spirit Award (Feature Film)
Best First Feature  
Best Documentary Feature
Best Short Narrative 
Best Short Animation 
Best Short Documentary  
Best Student Short

New Visions Program
New Visions Award (Feature Film)

Global Landscapes
Global Vision Award (Feature Film)

Screenplay Competition
Screenplay Award (1st, 2nd, and 3rd places recognized)

Audience Award
Audience Award Narrative Feature  
Audience Award Documentary Feature  
Audience Award Short Film

Also awarded at Cinequest:

Kaiser Permanente Thrive Award

Kaiser Permanente Thrive Award is given to the most inspiring and life affirming film.

Virtual and Augmented Reality Awards

 Best Immersive
 Best VR Film
 Best AR Experience
 Best Game
 Best Mixed or Volumetric Reality

Notable debuts

Independent films that premiered at Cinequest and went on to further distribution by a major movie studio:

Oscar nominees
Cinequest is a qualifying festival, with the Best Narrative Short and Best Animated Short both being eligible for an Academy Award. Short films shown at Cinequest that have received nominations for Academy Awards include:

Films shown at Cinequest that have received nominations for Academy Awards include:

References

Further reading

External links
Official site

Culture of San Jose, California
Film festivals in the San Francisco Bay Area
Film festivals established in 1990
1990 establishments in California
Tourist attractions in San Jose, California
Internet film festivals